Don't Let Me Down may refer to:

 "Don't Let Me Down" (Beatles song), 1969
 "Don't Let Me Down" (The Chainsmokers song), 2016
 "Don't Let Me Down" (Disney song), from the Disney film Bedknobs and Broomsticks
 "Don't Let Me Down" (Eskimo Joe song), 2009
 "Don't Let Me Down" (The Farm song), 1991
 "Don't Let Me Down" (Leona Lewis song), 2009
 "Don't Let Me Down" (Lotta Engberg and Christer Sjögren song), 2012
 "Don't Let Me Down" (Will Young song), 2002
 "Don't Let Me Down", a song by Bad Company from Bad Company
 "Don't Let Me Down", a song by Band-Maid from New Beginning
 "Don't Let Me Down", a song by Big K.R.I.T. from Live from the Underground
 "Don't Let Me Down", a song by Eddie Thoneick featuring Michael Feiner from the compilation album Ministry of Sound Sessions Six
 "Don't Let Me Down", a song by Gotthard from the album Need to Believe
 "Don't Let Me Down", a song by The Hollies from Hollies
 "Don't Let Me Down", a song by Idina Menzel from I Stand
 "Don't Let Me Down", a song by Julian Lennon from Photograph Smile
 "Don't Let Me Down", a song by Juliana Hatfield from In Exile Deo
 "Don't Let Me Down", a song by Mabel from Destination
 "Don't Let Me Down", a song by Meghan Trainor from Meghan Trainor
 "Don't Let Me Down", a song by Michael McDonald from No Lookin' Back
 "Don't Let Me Down", a song by No Doubt from Rock Steady
 "Don't Let Me Down", a song by Twisted Sister from Stay Hungry

See also
 "Don't Let Me Down & Down", a song by Tahra and Martine Valmont from Black Tie White Noise
 "Don't Let Me Down, Gently", a song by The Wonder Stuff from Hup
 "Don't Let Me Down (Slowly)", a song by The Main Drag from You Are Underwater
 "DLMD", a song by 311 from 311
 "DLMD", a song by Darren Styles and TNT
 Don't Bring Me Down (disambiguation)